The 1986 All-Pacific-10 Conference football team consists of American football players chosen by various organizations for All-Pacific-10 Conference teams for the 1986 college football season.

Offensive selections

Quarterback
Chris Miller, Oregon

Running backs
Brad Muster, Stanford
Gaston Green, UCLA
David Adams, Arizona

Wide receivers
 Lonzell Hill, Washington
 Aaron Cox, Arizona State

Tight end
 Rod Jones, Washington

Tackles
Danny Villa, Arizona State

Guards
Jeff Bregel, USC
Randall McDaniel, Arizona State
Jeff Tofflemire, Arizona

Center
Mike Zandofsky, Washington

Defensive selections

Linemen
Reggie Rogers, Washington
Skip McClendon, Arizona State
Terry Tumey, UCLA
Tony Leiker, Stanford

Linebackers
Byron Evans, Arizona
Marcus Cotton, USC
Scott Stephen, Arizona State
Dave Wyman, Stanford

Defensive backs
Tim McDonald, USC
Chuck Cecil, Arizona
Craig Rutledge, UCLA
Tim Peoples, Washington

Special teams

Placekicker
Jeff Jaeger, Washington

Punter
 Mike Preacher, Oregon

Return specialist 
Thomas Henley, Stanford

Key

See also
1986 College Football All-America Team

References

All-Pacific-10 Conference Football Team
All-Pac-12 Conference football teams